Events in the year 1967 in Turkey.

Parliament
 13th Parliament of Turkey

Incumbents
President – Cevdet Sunay
Prime Minister –  Süleyman Demirel
Leader of the opposition – İsmet İnönü

Ruling party and the main opposition
  Ruling party – Justice Party (AP)  
  Main opposition –  Republican People's Party (CHP)

Cabinet
30th government of Turkey

Events
 3 January – Anadol, the first Turkish made car
 30 April – Reliance Party formed.
 12 May – Reliance Party was founded by Turhan Feyzioğlu
 4 June – Beşiktaş won the championship of Turkish football league 
 22 July – The 7.1  Mudurnu earthquake affected the Bolu Province with high intensity shaking, killing 86.
 27 July – Earthquake in Pülümür (about 1000 km east of the 22 July earthquake)
 13 September – An agreement about transporting a group of Turks living in the island Adakale in Romania.
 17 September – More than 40 people died during a fight after the football match between Kayserispor and Sivasspor.
 31 October – Turkish Cypriot leader Rauf Denktaş was arrested by the Greek Cypriots
 18 November – Following Greek attacks to Turkish villages in Cyprus Turkish air raids to Greek forces.
 29 November – Turkey and Greece agreed on a plan to halt the hostilities
 29 December – Turks in Cyprus formed their own government

Birth
1 January – Mehmet Şimşek, government minister 
27 February – Volkan Konak, singer
4 April – Ali Babacan, deputy prime minister
4 November – Yılmaz Erdoğan, filmmaker
20 November Teoman Yakupoğlu, singer

Undated
Murat Günel, Turkish medical scientist

Deaths
9 March – Vâlâ Nureddin (born in 1901), poet and columnist
11 March – Yusuf Ziya Ortaç (born in 1895), humorist and publisher
17 May – Nurullah Ataç (born in 1898), essayist and literary critic
30 June – Yavuz Abadan (born in 1905), academic
20 July – Fikret Mualla Saygı (1904), painter
23 July – Ahmet Kutsi Tecer (born in 1901), poet and politician
5 August – Mustafa İnan (born in 1911), academic and civil engineer
13 September – Şerif Muhiddin Targan (born in 1892), musician

Gallery

See also
 1966–67 1.Lig

References

 
Years of the 20th century in Turkey
Turkey
Turkey
Turkey